Alexander Mikhailovich Kudryavtsev (born 26 October 1985) is a retired Russian professional tennis player who has played professionally since 2003. He made his breakthrough in 2008, playing in his first top-level international tournaments on the ATP tour, having spent time playing at the ATP Challenger Tour and Futures events. He reached his career-high singles ranking of 117 on 2 February 2015 and career-high doubles ranking of 70 on 7 November 2011.

Professional career

Early career 
Kudryavtsev reached the quarter-finals in a futures event in Bucharest in 2003. In 2004 he advanced to the second round in three futures events, and won a doubles challenger title. In 2005 he was a semi-finalist in a Beijing futures tournament, and reached the quarterfinals in Korolev (Russia) and Minsk (Belarus). In 2006 he became a finalist for the first time in Uzbekistan, as well as reaching the semi-finals once and the quarter-finals twice in other events.

In 2007 he started by winning his first Futures title in India and followed it up by winning a second in Belarus in May. In the second half of the season he was a quarter- or semi-finalist in six Challenger events with a 15–11 win–loss record. He also reached 9 finals (5 wins with three different partners) in doubles competitions and finished the year ranked No. 96 in doubles.

2008 
Kudryavtsev began the year positively by reaching the second round of his maiden top-level tournament. After coming through qualifying he beat Prakash Amritraj of India. In the second round he faced former World No. 1 Carlos Moyá and lost in a hard-fought game 3–6, 7–6(4), 2–6. His next international event was at Estoril in Portugal in April where he lost in the first round to France's Thierry Ascione (ranked #82).

He competed in his first Masters Series event at Toronto in Canada in July. In the first round he upset No. 33 ranked Philipp Kohlschreiber of Germany 6–2, 7–6(7) but he could not repeat this in the second round as he lost to Frenchman Richard Gasquet (ranked #12).

2012 
Kudryavtsev began the year by qualifying for the Australian Open main draw. He met No. 3 seed Roger Federer in the opening round and lost in three sets.

Singles performance timeline 

''This table is current through the 2016 US Open.

Personal life 
Kudryavtsev began playing tennis at the age of six while living in St. Petersburg in Russia. He admired tennis players Andre Agassi and countryman Marat Safin while growing up and strove to be as good as them. As a professional he enjoys playing on most surfaces except grass and does not have a favorite shot. He's coached by Vadim Davletshin.
He married his wife Rushana on 16 March 2007 and they had a son named Egor (born 6 August 2007)

Career finals

ATP career finals

Doubles: 1 (1 runner-up)

Challengers and Futures finals

Singles: 17 (6 titles, 11 runners-up)

Doubles: 55 (33 titles, 22 runners-up)

References

External links 
 
 

1985 births
Living people
Sportspeople from Saint Petersburg
Russian male tennis players